Forugh-e Javidan ("eternal light" in Persian) may refer to:
 Film, called Flames of Persia in international release, about the 1971 celebration of the Persian Empire's 2,500th anniversary
 Operation Forough Javidan, 1988 attack on Iran by the Iraq-based People's Mujahedin of Iran

See also
 Eternal light (disambiguation)
Operation Forty Stars